Raymond Clifton Manson (December 3, 1926 – November 10, 2004) was a Canadian professional ice hockey player who played one game each for the Boston Bruins and New York Rangers on March 17, 1948 and March 20, 1949, respectively. The rest of his career, which lasted from 1947 to 1957, was spent in various minor leagues.

As a senior ice hockey player, Manson won the 1958 Allan Cup national championship as a member of the Winnipeg Maroons.

Career statistics

Regular season and playoffs

Awards and achievements
MJHL Scoring Champion (1947)
Turnbull Cup MJHL Championship (1947)
WHL Prairie Division First All-Star Team (1957)
WHL Championship (1957)
Honoured Member of the Manitoba Hockey Hall of Fame

External links

Ray Manson's biography at Manitoba Hockey Hall of Fame

1926 births
2004 deaths
Boston Bruins players
Boston Olympics players
Brandon Elks players
Brandon Regals players
Canadian expatriate ice hockey players in the United States
Canadian ice hockey left wingers
New York Rangers players
New York Rovers players
People from Saint Boniface, Winnipeg
Saskatoon Quakers players
Saskatoon Regals/St. Paul Saints players
St. Boniface Canadiens players
St. Paul Saints (USHL) players
Ice hockey people from Winnipeg
Vancouver Canucks (WHL) players
Winnipeg Esquires players
Winnipeg Maroons players
Winnipeg Rangers players